The Cobweb Bridge, also known as Spider Bridge, is located in the city centre of Sheffield, South Yorkshire, England, near the disused Sheffield Victoria railway station. Completed in 2002, its design solves a difficult problem: passing the riverside cycle- and footpath (the Five Weirs Walk) under the massive Wicker Arches viaduct while linking one bank of the River Don to the other. Without the Cobweb Bridge, the footpath would have had to make a one-mile detour.

Completing the theme, large steel likenesses of spiders conceal the overhead lighting.

While the bridge has been prone to vandalism in the past (the wires forming the parapet having been stolen more than once), the bridge was repaired in 2015 to reduce the risk of future vandalism. The newly restored bridge no longer uses wires in the parapet, having been replaced with metal plates with spiderweb designs.

See also
List of bridges in the United Kingdom

References

Bridges in Sheffield
Bridges over the River Don, South Yorkshire
Bridges completed in 2002
Pedestrian bridges in England
2002 establishments in England